Khvoshnam (also Romanized as Khvoshnām; also known as Shahnām) is a village in Fardis Rural District, in the Central District of Fardis County, Alborz Province, Iran. At the 2006 census, its population was 3,211, in 783 families.

References 

Populated places in Malard County